Yicheng District is a district of Zaozhuang, Shandong, China. (2003)

Administrative divisions
As 2012, this district is divided to 2 subdistricts and 5 towns.
Subdistricts
Tanshan Subdistrict
Wulin Subdistrict

Towns

Climate

References

External links 
 Information page

County-level divisions of Shandong